Olav Jordet (born 27 December 1939) is a former Norwegian biathlete who was born in Tolga. He became Norway's first individual biathlon world champion in 1965, has world championship relay gold medals in 1966 and 1967. He won a bronze medal in the 20 km at the 1964 Olympics in Innsbruck, and was a part of the Norwegian relay team that won a silver medal in Grenoble 1968. He has many Norwegian titles in biathlon and skiing area shooting.

Olav Jordet represented Vingelen Skytterlag. He was awarded Morgenbladets Gullmedalje in 1965.

Biathlon results
All results are sourced from the International Biathlon Union.

Olympic Games
2 medals (1 silver, 1 bronze)

*The relay was added as an event in 1968.

World Championships
6 medals (4 gold, 2 bronze)

*During Olympic seasons competitions are only held for those events not included in the Olympic program.
**The team (time) event was removed in 1965, whilst the relay was added in 1966.

References

External links
 

1939 births
Living people
People from Tolga, Norway
Norwegian male biathletes
Biathletes at the 1964 Winter Olympics
Biathletes at the 1968 Winter Olympics
Olympic biathletes of Norway
Medalists at the 1964 Winter Olympics
Medalists at the 1968 Winter Olympics
Olympic medalists in biathlon
Olympic bronze medalists for Norway
Olympic silver medalists for Norway
Biathlon World Championships medalists
Sportspeople from Innlandet